The 1952 Cleveland Browns season was the team's third season with the National Football League and seventh season overall. They were 8–4 in the regular season and won the American Conference. Cleveland hosted the NFL Championship Game, but lost 17–7 to the Detroit Lions.

Exhibition schedule

Regular season

Schedule

Note: Intra-division opponents are in bold text.
 Saturday night (October 4)

Game summaries

Week 1
The Browns avenged their December championship game loss to Los Angeles with a 37–7 romp over the Rams at Cleveland Stadium. The Browns took a 23–0 halftime lead and never headed. Ken Carpenter rushed for 145 yards on 16 carries and the Browns defense limited Rams quarterbacks Norm Van Brocklin and Bob Waterfield to a combined six completions in 27 attempts.

Week 4
Despite being without injured wide receiver Dante Lavelli and Carpenter and then losing defensive end Bob Gain to a broken jaw, the Browns had little problem pounding the Eagles 49–7 in Philadelphia. It is Cleveland's 5th win over Philadelphia in as many meetings. Otto Graham threw for 290 yards and four touchdowns and even backup quarterback George Ratterman got into the act, throwing an 11-yard touchdown pass to Horace Gillom.

Week 6
In the first-ever regular season meeting between the Detroit Lions and the Browns, the Lions won 17–6, at Briggs Stadium. The Lions led 10–6, when a Graham pass intended for Ray Renfro was picked off by Detroit's Jack Christiansen. On the Lions next play from scrimmage, Bob Hoernschemeyer ran for 41 yards, setting up a Bobby Layne to Leon Hart touchdown pass.

Week 10
The Browns took a one-game lead in the Eastern Conference with a 48–24 win at Washington. Chick Jagade ran for 127 yards on 16 carries, including a 17-yard touchdown scamper on a draw play. Carpenter also had a big day returning punts including one for 53 yards and a touchdown.

Week 12
Needing a win in the season finale to clinch the American Conference Title, the Browns (8–3) traveled to the Polo Grounds in New York City, but lost to the Giants, 37–34. Charlie Conerly fired four touchdown passes for the Giants while Graham threw three interceptions. The Browns clinched anyway when Washington upset Philadelphia.

Standings

NFL Championship Game

Roster and coaching staff

References

External links 
 1952 Cleveland Browns at Pro Football Reference (profootballreference.com)
 1952 Cleveland Browns Statistics at jt-sw.com
 1952 Cleveland Browns Schedule at jt-sw.com
 1952 Cleveland Browns at DatabaseFootball.com  

Cleveland
Cleveland Browns seasons
Cleveland Browns